Screen NSW, formerly known as the New South Wales Film and Television Office, or FTO, and before that the New South Wales Film Corporation, is a brand name that is part of  Create NSW, an agency of the Government of New South Wales that is responsible for supporting and promoting the arts, artists and the various cultural bodies within the state of New South Wales in Australia. Screen NSW assists, promotes and strengthens the screen industry in the state of New South Wales. It was previously an agency in its own right, but since 1 April 2017 has been part of Create NSW. The name "Screen NSW" ceased to exist within Create NSW between that date and September 2019, when a restructure resurrected the brand. As of July 2022, Kyas Hepworth is the Head of Screen NSW.

History
The New South Wales Film Corporation was established as a statutory body in 1977. It was dissolved by the Film Industry Act 1988, with all of its functions taken over by the newly-created New South Wales Film and Television Office (known as the FTO).

On 5 June 2009, the FTO announced a name change to Screen NSW, to reflect the age of digital media, and from 1 July 2009 Screen NSW was transferred from the Department of Arts, Sport and Recreation to the Department of Industry and Investment. From 4 April 2011, when the department name was changed, Screen NSW became a branch of the Department of Trade and Investment, Regional Infrastructure and Services.

The agency was led by chief executive Courtney Gibson from November 2015. Under the old structure, the chief executive was responsible to the Executive Director of Arts NSW, who was in turn responsible to the Secretary of the Department of Justice. The agency previously advised the Minister for the Arts.

On 1 April 2017, Screen NSW was amalgamated with Arts NSW to form Create NSW. The Screen NSW banner was removed, CEO Courtney Gibson left the role, and Michael Brealey, then acting executive director of Arts NSW, became CEO of the new agency.

Create NSW fell within the Arts, Screen and Culture Division of the Department of Planning and Environment (abolished on 1 July 2019). As a result of a government restructure in April 2019 after a state election, Create NSW was moved to the Minister for the Public Service and Employee Relations, Aboriginal Affairs, and the Arts, then held by Don Harwin and administered through the Community Engagement portfolio of the Department of Premier and Cabinet headed by Deputy Secretary, Community Engagement, Clare Foy.

In September 2019, a restructuring of the leadership team of Create NSW led to the resurrection of the Screen NSW brand, and Grainne Brunsdon appointed head of that team, which remains part of Create NSW. 

After Harwin's resignation on 10 April 2020, the Premier, Gladys Berjiklian, took over the arts portfolio.

In July 2022, respected screen and arts executive Kyas Hepworth was appointed Head of Screen NSW.

Description
Screen NSW aims to promote Australia’s cultural identity, encourage employment in all aspects of screen production, encourage investment in the industry, enhance the industry’s export potential, encourage innovation and enhance quality in the industry.

It receives recurrent funding on an annual basis from the NSW Government; it then allocates funding across its programs for that year. It provides funding for items such as production finance, festival travel and an industry development fund. It offers incentives for filming in the state of New South Wales, and helps to provide opportunities for Indigenous Australian filmmakers.

Production funding allocations are
guided by ratios linking the Screen NSW contribution to the amount spent by the production in NSW state.

See also

 Film Victoria
 List of New South Wales Government Agencies
 Screen Australia
 South Australian Film Corporation

References

External links

Film and Television Office
Film production companies of Australia